Hainer See is a lake near Borna, Saxony, Germany. The lake is a part of the Central German Lake District.

Lakes of Saxony
Mining in Saxony-Anhalt